Calcium-dependent secretion activator 1 is a protein that in humans is encoded by the CADPS gene.

CADPS encodes a novel neural/endocrine-specific cytosolic and peripheral membrane protein required for the Ca2+-regulated exocytosis of secretory vesicles. CADPS acts at a stage in exocytosis that follows ATP-dependent priming, which involves the essential synthesis of phosphatidylinositol 4,5-bisphosphate (PtdIns(4,5)P2). Alternative splicing has been observed at this locus and three variants, encoding distinct isoforms, are described.

References

External links

Further reading